OSSD is an abbreviation which stands for:

 Ocean Springs School District
 Ontario Secondary School Diploma
 Open-source software development
 Output Signal Switching Device